is a  garden near Henderson Lake in Lethbridge, Alberta, designed by Dr. Masami Sugimoto and Dr. Tadashi Kubo of Osaka Prefecture University in Japan. The pavilion, shelter, bridges and gates were built in Kyoto, Japan, by five artisans who later reassembled them in the garden. It was opened July 14, 1967, during the Canadian Centennial celebrations.

History

In the early 1960s, Lethbridgian Reverend Yutetsu Kawamura, a minister of Buddhist churches in Alberta, and Cleo Mowers, editor and publisher of the Lethbridge Herald, were independently considering the possibility of a Japanese garden being built in Lethbridge. Kurt Steiner, the manager of the Lethbridge Travel and Convention Bureau, eventually brought the two together and a steering committee was formed.

The steering committee, headed by Rev. Kawamura, brought a proposal to the Lethbridge City Council that was subsequently approved on 6 January 1964. The committee proposed a Japanese Garden Committee be appointed to oversee the garden's construction. By the following summer, the committee was granted official society status and later became the Lethbridge & District Japanese Garden Society.

Initially, Dr. Tadashi Kubo, landscape architect from the University of Osaka, provided design expertise, but he later handed the responsibility to his assistant Masami Sugimoto, who attended the groundbreaking ceremony. He provided consultation on maintenance and improvements presently. The original basis for the design was created by Ayako Hitomi, a student of Dr. Kubo at the time.

After 21 months of construction, the garden publicly opened for the first time on 3 July 1966. The grand opening was held the following year, on 14 July 1967 during Canada's centennial celebrations. Japan's Prince and Princess Takamatsu attended the grand opening celebration.

The name Nikka Yuko means Japan-Canada friendship, and was chosen to symbolize the enduring friendship between the two nations and to acknowledge the contributions of Japanese Canadians to Southern Alberta.

Features

Core design concepts utilized in the garden include Wabi-sabi, (beauty in age/simplicity), Shakkei, (borrowed view), and Miegakure, (hide and reveal).

Water, (and in the case of a karesansui, its simulated form in sand), comprise some of the major features of Nikka Yuko, as in most Japanese landscape gardens.

Trees used are primarily conifers, with a barrier of evergreens to break the wind and create a perceived separation from the outside world. Many of the plants are pruned in the Niwaki style, exposing the branch structure and emulating trees found in extreme conditions, or ones later in their life cycle.

Stones and rocks are used liberally, either in representation of their natural form, or symbolically to suggest other aspects of a setting such as mountains, waterfalls or islands set in seas or oceans.

Man-made structures such as the Pavilion and Bell Tower also play a significant part in the garden's design, as man made objects are meant to contrast the garden's landscape.

Structures 

Wishing well, symbolic of freshwater wells used to collect water for Tea ceremonies.
Pavilion, Sukiya-zukuri style, constructed entirely from Taiwanese Hinoki wood, as opposed to Japanese Hinoki.
Chashitsu
Mizuya
Dry-rock garden
Azumaya
Stone lanterns
Wooden bridges
Bell Tower
Bonshō Style Bell, created as a symbol of friendship between Japan and Canada.
Moon bridge

Landscaping 

Mountain
Waterfall
Streams
Ponds
Islands
Flat "Prairie Garden", with peony wall.

Governance

The management and administration of the garden is overseen by the Lethbridge & District Japanese Garden Society, which was established 20 May 1965. Its board of directors consists of 13 volunteers elected for a three-year term. Additionally, the garden is staffed by an executive director, visitor experience manager, marketing manager, education and programming manager, two supervisory staff, two gardening staff, two maintenance staff, a pruning technician, a head host/hostess and up to twelve interpretive guides.

External links

Nikka Yuko Japanese Garden

Asian-Canadian culture in Alberta
Culture of Lethbridge
Parks in Lethbridge
Japanese gardens in Canada
Japanese friendship gardens
Botanical gardens in Canada